Bondar-e Gavsin (also Romanized as Bondar-e Gāvsīn; also known as Bondargāvsīn) is a village in Garmsar Rural District, Jebalbarez-e Jonubi District, Anbarabad County, Kerman Province, Iran. At the 2006 census, its population was 79, in 15 families.

References 

Populated places in Anbarabad County